Gordon Nesbit Geddes (8 July 1922 – 5 July 1982) was an Australian rules footballer who played with St Kilda in the Victorian Football League (VFL).

Notes

External links 

1922 births
1982 deaths
Australian rules footballers from Victoria (Australia)
St Kilda Football Club players
People from Echuca